Kaliopi is an unincorporated community located in Leslie County, Kentucky, United States. It is located just on Hell For Certain Creek. Its post office closed in 1984.

References

Unincorporated communities in Leslie County, Kentucky
Unincorporated communities in Kentucky